The I Armored Corps was a corps-sized formation of the United States Army that was active in World War II.

The Corps made landfall in Morocco in French North Africa during Operation Torch in November 1942, the Allied invasion of French North Africa, as the Western Task Force, under the command of Major General George S. Patton, the first all-American force to enter the war against the Germans.

Following the successful defeat of the Axis powers under Generalfeldmarschall Erwin Rommel in North Africa, in May 1943, I Armored Corps was redesignated as the Seventh Army on 10 July 1943 while at sea en route to the Allied invasion of Sicily as the spearhead of Operation Husky.

History
 Established – 15 July 1940 – at Fort Knox, Kentucky under the command of Major-General Adna R. Chaffee Jr.
 Change of command – November 1940 – Major-General Charles L. Scott assumes command
 Change of command – 15 January 1942 – Major-General George S. Patton assumes command
 Transfer of Headquarters – January 1942 – to Fort Benning, Georgia
 Training – 26 March 1942 – Patton designated to set up Desert Training Center
 Training – 10 April 1942 to 30 July 1942 – at Desert Training Center, California-Arizona Maneuver Area (DTC-CAMA)
 Planning – 30 July 1942 – 5 August 1942 – Patton and staff does initial planning for Operation Torch in Washington, DC
 Planning – 5 August 1942 – 21 August 1942 – Patton and staff does higher level planning for Operation Torch in London, England
 Tactical Deception – 11 September 1942 – I Armored Corps redesignated as Western Task Force to carry out Operation Torch.
 Combat Mission – Operation Torch – 8 November 1942 – landed near Casablanca
 Cessation of Tactical Deception – 9 January 1943 – Western Task Force redesignated as I Armored Corps
 Change of command – 4 March 1943 – Patton reassigned to command II Corps after MG Lloyd Fredendall is relieved following the loss at the Battle of Kasserine Pass
 Change of command – 15 April 1943 – Lieutenant-General Patton resumes command
 Redesignated – 10 July 1943 –  I Armored Corps becomes U.S. Seventh Army

Subordinate units
 3rd Infantry Division – 1 February 1943 to 15 July 1943
 9th Infantry Division – 25 December 1942 to May 1943
 2nd Armored Division - 25 December 1942 to 15 July 1943

Heraldic items

Shoulder sleeve insignia

Description: On an equilateral triangle with a green border, one point up, divided into three sections, the upper section yellow, the dexter section blue, and the sinister section red, a gun bendwise in front of a tank track and wheels all black and overall a red lightning flash bend sinisterwise. In the apex the Roman numeral "I" in black.
Symbolism:
Yellow, blue, and red are the colors of the branches from which armored units were formed.
The tank tread, gun, and lightning flash are symbolic of mobility, power, and speed.
The corps designation is in Roman numerals.

Distinctive unit insignia
None approved.

References

Sources

01
01
01
Military units and formations established in 1940
Military units and formations disestablished in 1943
1940 establishments in Kentucky